Kamran Aliyev (born 15 October 1998) is a Russian football second striker for Sumgayit.

Club career
He made his debut in the Russian Football National League for Khimki on 17 May 2017 in a game against Sokol Saratov. He scored his first goal for Khimki in the Russian Football National League match against Avangard Kursk in a 3–1 home victory on 4 August 2018.

He made his Russian Premier League debut for FC Khimki on 8 August 2020 in a game against PFC CSKA Moscow.

On 1 September 2021, he joined SKA-Khabarovsk on loan for the 2021–22 season. On 4 February 2022, Aliyev moved to SKA-Khabarovsk on a permanent basis.

On 10 February 2023, Sumgayit announced the signing of Aliyev.

International career
Aliyev was called up and played for the Azerbaijan U20 match against Georgia on 16 May 2018.  On 24 May 2018, he scored his first goal for the Azerbaijan U20, in a friendly match against Macedonia U21.

References

External links
 
 
 Profile by Russian Football National League

1998 births
Footballers from Baku
Living people
Azerbaijani footballers
Association football forwards
Azerbaijan youth international footballers
FC Khimki players
FC SKA-Khabarovsk players
FC Arsenal Tula players
Sumgayit FK players
Russian Premier League players
Russian First League players
Azerbaijani expatriate footballers
Expatriate footballers in Russia
Azerbaijani expatriate sportspeople in Russia